Arctides antipodum is a species of slipper lobster in the family Scyllaridae.

References

Achelata
Crustaceans described in 1960